The pallid ghost crab, Ocypode pallidula, is a small ghost crab that digs burrows in beaches of the Indo-Pacific region.

References

Ocypodoidea
Crustaceans described in 1846